Sphaericus gibboides, the humped spider beetle, is a species of spider beetle in the family Ptinidae. It is found in Africa, Australia, Europe and Northern Asia (excluding China), and North America.

References

Further reading

 
 

Bostrichoidea
Articles created by Qbugbot
Beetles described in 1854